As Man Made Her is a 1917 American silent drama film directed by George Archainbaud and starring Gail Kane, Frank Mills and Gerda Holmes.

Cast
 Gail Kane as Claire Wilson 
 Frank Mills as Mason Forbes 
 Gerda Holmes as Grace Hughes 
 Edward Langford as Harold Forbes 
 Miss Layton as Claire's Maid 
 Miss McDonald as Nurse

References

Bibliography
 Langman, Larry. American Film Cycles: The Silent Era. Greenwood Publishing, 1998.

External links
 

1917 films
1917 drama films
1910s English-language films
American silent feature films
Silent American drama films
Films directed by George Archainbaud
American black-and-white films
World Film Company films
Films shot in Fort Lee, New Jersey
1910s American films